Ocular neurosis is the usual cause of eye strain headache that begins abruptly with use of the eyes in which there is a normal ophthalmologic exam.

ICD classification: F45.8   Neurosis ocular

References

External links
 
 

Eye diseases